Ugolny (masculine), Ugolnaya (feminine), or Ugolnoye (neuter) is the name of several rural localities in Russia.

Modern localities
Ugolny (rural locality), a settlement in Tyulkovsky Selsoviet of Balakhtinsky District in Krasnoyarsk Krai
Ugolnoye, Amur Oblast, a selo under the administrative jurisdiction of Raychikhinsk Urban Okrug in Amur Oblast
Ugolnoye, Nizhny Novgorod Oblast, a village in Bolsheokulovsky Selsoviet of Navashinsky District in Nizhny Novgorod Oblast; 
Ugolnoye, Orenburg Oblast, a selo in Ugolny Selsoviet of Sol-Iletsky District in Orenburg Oblast
Ugolnoye, Oryol Oblast (also Ugolny, Ugolnaya), a village in Rechitsky Selsoviet of Livensky District in Oryol Oblast; 
Ugolnoye, Sakha Republic, a selo in Ugolninsky Rural Okrug of Verkhnekolymsky District in the Sakha Republic
Ugolnoye, Tula Oblast, a village in Chentsovskaya Rural Administration of Odoyevsky District in Tula Oblast
Ugolnaya, Alarsky District, Irkutsk Oblast, a village in Alarsky District of Irkutsk Oblast
Ugolnaya, Bokhansky District, Irkutsk Oblast, a village in Bokhansky District of Irkutsk Oblast

Alternative names
Ugolny (Ugolnoye), alternative names of Bylym, a selo in Elbrussky District of the Kabardino-Balkar Republic;